Pinault Collection is the legal entity  holding the artistic and cultural assets of the French businessman François Pinault. It manages the art collection of the Pinault family, its exhibition sites, institutional and cultural partnerships, art loans, and artist-in-residence programs.

Museums

Venice: Palazzo Grassi

In 2005, François Pinault bought the Palazzo Grassi from the Fiat Group. This Venetian complex is composed of two distinct buildings, a historical palazzo built along the Grand Canal during the 18th century, and an old theater in ruins, the Teatrino. In 2006, Japanese architect and Pritzker Prize laureate Tadao Ando was commissioned with the Palazzo's renovation. That same year, the new Palazzo Grassi was inaugurated with an exhibition of artwork from the Pinault Collection.

Venice: Punta della Dogana

A year after the Palazzo Grassi opening, the Venice city council organized a competition to convert the 16th century custom house Punta della Dogana into a contemporary art museum. François Pinault won the competition over the Solomon R. Guggenheim Foundation. Pinault enlisted Tadao Ando once again for renovations, as the building had been abandoned for over 30 years.

The new museum boasts a 54,000 square feet exhibition area and was inaugurated in 2009.

Venice: Teatrino
Following the Palazzo Grassi (2006), and Punta della Dogana (2009) restorations, Pinault's cultural project for Venice continued with the rehabilitation of the Palazzo Grassi's Teatrino. Completed in 2013 and led by Tadao Ando, the project included a new auditorium of 200+ seats. The Teatrino had been closed to the public since 1983.

Paris: Bourse de Commerce

In April 2016, François Pinault and the Council of Paris announced plans to convert the city's landmark building Bourse de Commerce into a contemporary art museum. The renovation project reportedly cost over 100 million euros. The museum will host around 10 exhibitions per year. According to François Pinault, the new museum will work in coordination with its Venetian sister museums. Collaborations with other Parisian art institutions are also planned.

François Pinault entrusted Tadao Ando again for this renovation. He teamed up with Pierre-Antoine Gatier (architect-in-chief of the French National Heritage), as well as Lucy Niney and Thibault Marca of NeM agency, and Setec Bâtiment for the engineering of the project. The façades, the roof and the circular painting in the building's dome were rehabilitated. A 30-feet high and 100-feet in diameter concrete cylinder built beneath the central cupola serves as the main exhibition gallery, a "building within a building". The project covers a 32,000 square feet modular exhibition surface and a restaurant on the 3rd floor. The French designers Ronan & Erwan Bouroullec were entrusted with the museum's interior and exterior furnishings. The museum opened on 22 May 2021.

Exhibitions
The Palazzo Grassi and the Punta della Dogana in Venice have been Pinault Collection's main exhibition sites since 2006. Pinault Collection pieces have been presented outside of the Pinault's museums thanks to a blue-chip artwork loan program available to both French and international art institutions, along with offsite exhibitions in different cities.

Other activities

Artist-in-residence program
At the end of 2015, the first Pinault Collection artist-in-residence program was set up in Lens, a former mining city in the North of France where the Louvre opened a local branch known as the Louvre-Lens. An old rectory was chosen for conversion into the main residency building. NeM Architectes designed and led this operation. Six international artists went through the program:
Melissa Dubbin and Aaron S. Davidson (2015/2016)
Edith Dekyndt (2016/2017)
Lucas Arruda (2017/2018)
Hicham Berrada (2018/2019)
Bertille Bak (2019/2020)

Pierre Daix Artbook Prize
François Pinault created the Pierre Daix Artbook Prize in 2015, honoring his late friend, the writer and Picasso's biographer Pierre Daix. The Pinault Collection awards yearly one outstanding book on modern and contemporary art history with 10 000 euros. Previous winners were:
2019: Rémi Labrousse, Préhistoire, l'envers du temps.
2018: Pierre Wat, Pérégrinations. Paysages entre nature et histoire.
2017: Élisabeth Lebovici, Ce que le sida m'a fait - Art et activisme à la fin du XXe siècle.
2016: Maurice Fréchuret, Effacer. Paradoxe d'un geste artistique.
2015: Yve-Alain Bois, Ellsworth Kelly: Catalogue Raisonné of Paintings, Reliefs, and Sculpture, Volume One, 1940–1953Marie-Anne Lescourret for Aby Warburg ou la tentation du regard.

The 2020 edition of the Pierre Daix Artbook Prize was cancelled.

Revue Pinault Collection
First edited in 2013, the Revue Pinault Collection is a bi-annual magazine compiling all of the activities of Pinault Collection in Venice, Paris and the rest of the world.

Legal structure
Pinault Collection is a private company held by Pinault's Groupe Artémis. François Pinault is the President.

The Venetian sites (Palazzo Grassi, Punta della Dogana, Teatrino) are held and managed by Palazzo Grassi S.p.A. The city of Venice holds a non-controlling stake of Palazzo Grassi S.p.A. and is a member of the board.

As of 2019, the collection contained 5,000 pieces of 20th and 21st century artists, including works from Willem de Kooning, Piet Mondrian, Agnes Martin, Mark Rothko, Richard Serra, Damien Hirst, Takashi Murakami, Jeff Koons, Cy Twombly, and Cindy Sherman.

Related pages
François Pinault
Groupe Artémis

References

External links
Bourse de Commerce website
Revue Pinault Collection

Private art collections
Pinault family